Joe Richard Lansdale (born October 28, 1951) is an American writer and martial arts instructor. A prose writer in a variety of genres, including Western, horror, science fiction, mystery, and suspense, he has also written comic books and screenplays. Several of his novels have been adapted for film and television. He is the winner of the British Fantasy Award, the American Horror Award, the Edgar Award, and eleven Bram Stoker Awards.

Early life
Lansdale grew up in East Texas, the son of a mechanic.

Career
Lansdale's writing is characterized by a deep sense of irony, and features strange or absurd situations or characters, such as Elvis Presley and John F. Kennedy battling a soul-sucking Egyptian mummy in a nursing home (the plot of his Bram Stoker Award-nominated novella, Bubba Ho-Tep, which was made into a movie by Don Coscarelli). 

His Hap and Leonard series of twelve novels, four novellas, and three short story collections feature Hap Collins and Leonard Pine who live in the fictional town of Laborde, in East Texas, where they find themselves solving a variety of crimes. Hap is a white working class laborer in his mid forties who once protested against the war in Vietnam and spent time in federal prison rather than be drafted, and Leonard is a gay black Vietnam vet. Both of them are accomplished fighters. The stories (told from Hap's point of view) are violent, and characterized by strong language and sexual situations. Lansdale depiction of East Texas is essentially "good" but blighted by racism, ignorance, urban and rural deprivation and corrupt public officials. His novels are also characterized by sharp humor and "wisecracking" dialogue. These books have been adapted into a TV series for the SundanceTV channel and a series of graphic novels in 2017. Season 2 is based on the second Hap and Leonard novel Mucho Mojo and season 3, which premiered on 3/7/18, is based on the third novel The Two-Bear Mambo.
Much of Lansdale's work has been issued and re-issued as limited editions by Subterranean Press and as trade paperbacks by Vintage Crime/Black Lizard Publications.

Lansdale's novel titled Fender Lizards was published in November 2015 by Subterranean Press. In February 2016 two full-length novels Hell's Bounty was published Feb 27 also by Subterreanean Press and a new Hap and Leonard novel titled Honky Tonk Samurai was released Feb 2 by Mulholland Books. On January 31, 2017 Coco Butternut: A Hap and Leonard Novella was released by Subterranean Press and Rusty Puppy was released by Mulholland Books February 21, 2017. A new mosaic novel titled Blood and Lemonade was released on March 14, 2017.

Lansdale and daughter Kasey started a new publishing company called Pandi Press to control the re-issue and publication of his older works.

Lansdale book of essays and memoirs, Miracles Ain't What They Used To Be, was released by PM Press's Outspoken Author Series. His newest Hap and Leonard release is a novel titled Jackrabbit Smile and released March 27, 2018. He also, along with his daughter Kasey, released a collection of Dana Roberts mysteries titled Terror is Our Business: Dana Roberts' Casebook of Horrors, published in May 2018 by Cutting Block Books. In October 2018 a short story collection titled Driving to Geronimo's Grave and Other Stories has been published by Subterranean Press as a limited edition. His most recent novel is titled More Better Deals and was published by Mulholland Books. Its hardcover and Kindle releases were on July 21, 2020. Since then he released a novel Big Lizard co-written with his son Keith Lansdale released as a limited edition of 1500 hard-copies published by Short, Scary Tales Publications and is also available through Amazon Kindle.
His novel is titled Moon Lake and was released by Mulholland Books on June 22, 2021. He released a book of poetry titled Apache Witch as a limited edition that sold out right away and a Nat Love novella, Radiant Apples, published by Subterranean Press.

Personal life
Lansdale, who was born in Gladewater, Texas, lives in Nacogdoches, Texas, with his wife, Karen. He is the writer in residence at Stephen F. Austin State University. He also teaches at his own Shen Chuan martial arts school Lansdale's Self Defense Systems in Nacogdoches and is a member of the United States Martial Arts Hall of Fame as Sōke and the International Martial Arts Hall of Fame. He is the father of actress, musician and publisher Kasey Lansdale and reporter and screenwriter Keith Lansdale. He has described himself as an atheist, though he has also said that he is not anti-religion.

Film and television
Lansdale was a contributing writer for Batman: The Animated Series, credited with three episodes, namely "Perchance to Dream" (season 1, episode 26, which aired October 29, 1992), "Read My Lips"(season 1, episode #59 that aired May 10, 1993), and "Showdown" (season 4, episode 2, aired September 12, 1995). Lansdale also wrote "Identity Crisis" on Superman: The Animated Series (season 2, episode 6, airing September 15, 1997), and "Critters" (with Steve Gerber) for The New Batman Adventures (season 2, episode 2, airing September 19, 1998).

Lansdale's first film adaptation was Bubba Ho-Tep, based on his novella of the same and released in 2002. The film featured Elvis Presley and a man who believes himself to be John F. Kennedy, confined to an old-age rest home, teaming up to fight a mummy who is stealing their friends' souls.

In 2010, Lansdale wrote the screenplay for the animated short DC Showcase: Jonah Hex.
The short story Incident On and Off a Mountain Road was adapted for the first episode of the first season of Masters of Horror. It aired on October 28, 2005. Lansdale's story "The Job" was made into an 11-minute short in 1997 by A.W. Feidler. It is available on the out-of-print DVD collection, Short 5 – Diversity, on Warner Home Video. The short story "Drive-In Date" was filmed as a short by James Cahill, from a script written by Lansdale, published in A Fist Full of Stories.

The film Christmas with the Dead, based on the Lansdale short story of the same name, was filmed in East Texas in Summer 2011. The film starring Brad Maule, Damian Maffei, and Kasey Lansdale is currently showing on the film festival circuit and at private screenings. The DVD has been released. Actor and director Bill Paxton worked for six years on a film adaptation of Lansdale's novel The Bottoms. In a 2015 interview with Entertainment Weekly, Paxton admitted having difficulty getting the project off the ground. Paxton's death left unfinished projects, including The Bottoms movie.

Backup Media and Memento Films International financed Cold in July, an adaptation of Lansdale's cult novel was directed by Jim Mickle, with acting by Michael C. Hall and Sam Shepard. Filming began in 2013. Accompanied by a movie tie-in edition of the original story released by Tachyon Publications, the film was screened at the 2014 Sundance Film Festival.

Nick Damici and Jim Mickle developed a Hap and Leonard private investigator series for the Sundance Channel, which premiered in March 2016. On June 27, 2016, SundanceTV renewed the series for a six-episode second season, which aired in 2017 and was based on the second novel, Mucho Mojo. Season 3 is based the third book, The Two-Bear Mambo On May 14, 2018, SundanceTV announced the cancellation of the series.

Lansdale is the executive producer of the film The Pale Door.

Awards
Joe Lansdale has won eleven Bram Stoker Awards over the course of his long career. The short story Night They Missed the Horror Show won the award for "Short Fiction" in 1988. In the "Long Fiction" category (which is for novellas, though it also initially included comic book work as well), he won in 1989 for On the Far Side of the Cadillac Desert with Dead Folks, 1997 for The Big Blow, and 1999 for Mad Dog Summer (a shared award with Brian A. Hopkins' "Five Days in April"). In 1992 the story The Events Concerning a Nude Fold-Out Found in a Harlequin Romance shared the "Long Fiction" award with Aliens: Tribes by Steve Bissette. In 1993, Jonah Hex: Two Gun Mojo won in the newly created "Other Media" category. Lansdale's 2006 anthology Retro Pulp Tales tied for the Best Anthology category with Mondo Zombie edited by John Skipp. He won a Bram Stoker Award in the long fiction category for Fishing for Dinosaurs which was published in the collection Limbus 2.

The Drive-In and Savage Season were nominated in the "Novels" category in 1988 and 1990, respectively. By Bizarre Hands and Writer of the Purple Rage were nominated for "Fiction Collection" in 1989 and 1994. The short story Love Doll: A Fable was nominated in "Short Fiction" in 1991. The novella Bubba Ho-Tep was nominated for "Long Fiction" in 1994. Something Lumber This Way Comes was nominated in a new "Work for Younger Readers" category, and Jonah Hex: Shadows West #1 was nominated for "Illustrated Narrative", both in 1999. Red Romance (published in DC Comics' Flinch #11) was nominated for "Illustrated Narrative" in 2000.

Other nominations include:
 1986, Tight Little Stitches in a Dead Man's Back for a World Fantasy Award.
 2007, Cross Plains Universe: Texans Celebrate Robert E. Howard for a World Fantasy Award.
 He was nominated for the World Fantasy Award eleven times.

Other awards include:
 1990, On the Far Side of the Cadillac Desert with Dead Folks won the British Fantasy Award for best short story.
 1994, Mucho Mojo was named a New York Times Notable Book of the Year.
 2000, The Bottoms was given the Edgar Award for Best Novel by the Mystery Writers of America. It was also named a New York Times Notable Book of the Year and the Herodotus Award for best historical mystery novel. It was also nominated for a Dashiell Hammett Award for "Best Novel", as well as "Best Mystery Novel" in the Mystery Readers International's Macavity Awards in 1991.
2001, Inkpot Award
2007, he received the World Horror Convention Grand Master Award.
 2011, SUGARPRIZE for a body of work during the Sugarpulp Festival.
 2011, The Grinzane Cavour Prize for Literature for a body of work.
 2012, Edge of Dark Water was listed Booklist Editors' Choice for Adult Books for Young Adults by the American Library Association.
 2013, His novel The Thicket was voted one of the best historical novels by the Library Journal.
 2015, He received the Raymond Chandler lifetime achievement award.
 2016, The Western Writers of America gave Paradise Sky a Spur Award for Best Historical Western Novel.

He is also frequently cited as winning the American Mystery Award, the Horror Critics Award, and the "Shot in the Dark" International Crime Writer's award. 

The Horror Writers Association gave him and the late Rick Hautala Bram Stoker Award for Lifetime Achievement for 2011, which they received at the Bram Stoker Awards Banquet in Salt Lake City, Utah on March 31, 2012

On October 19, 2012 he was inducted into The Texas Literary Hall of Fame.

Bibliography

Adaptations
Incident On and Off a Mountain Road (Film)
Bubba Ho-Tep (Film)
Christmas with the Dead (Film)
Cold in July (Film)
Hap and Leonard (TV series)

See also
 List of horror fiction authors
 Mojo Press
 Subterranean Press
 Tachyon Publications
 Mulholland Books

References

External links

 Official website
 Interview Pt. 1
 Interview Pt. 2
 10 Questions for Joe R. Lansdale
 Texas Monthly Article
 
 
 

1951 births
Living people
20th-century American novelists
21st-century American novelists
American fantasy writers
American graphic novelists
American horror novelists
Chapbook writers
American mystery writers
American male novelists
American science fiction writers
American male screenwriters
American thriller writers
Edgar Award winners
People from Gladewater, Texas
People from Nacogdoches, Texas
Splatterpunk
Stephen F. Austin State University faculty
Novelists from Texas
Martial arts school founders
American martial artists
American male short story writers
20th-century American short story writers
21st-century American short story writers
20th-century American male writers
21st-century American male writers
Screenwriters from Texas
Writers from Texas
American satirists
Weird fiction writers
American crime fiction writers
American atheists
Inkpot Award winners